Gregory L. Gilday (born 1977) is an American attorney, businessman, and politician serving as a member of the Washington House of Representatives from the 10th district. He was elected in November 2020 and assumed office on January 11, 2021.

Background 
Gilday was born in Stanwood, Washington. He earned a Bachelor of Arts degree in economics from Western Washington University, a Master of Business Administration from Seattle University, and a Juris Doctor from the Seattle University School of Law. Prior to entering office, Gilday worked as an attorney and real estate broker. Gilday lives on Camano Island with his wife and two sons.

References

External links 
 Greg Gilday at ballotpedia.org
 Greg Gilday at votesmart.org

1977 births
Living people
21st-century American politicians
Western Washington University alumni
Seattle University alumni
Seattle University School of Law alumni
Washington (state) lawyers
People from Stanwood, Washington
Republican Party members of the Washington House of Representatives